Ethel B. Baker (May 21, 1906 - February 25, 1990) was an American politician from Maine. Baker, a Republican from Orrington, Maine, served in the Maine House of Representatives from 1959 to 1974.

References

1906 births
1990 deaths
People from Orrington, Maine
Republican Party members of the Maine House of Representatives
Women state legislators in Maine
20th-century American politicians
20th-century American women politicians